Sara Raynolds Hall is a historic building on the University of New Mexico campus in Albuquerque, New Mexico. Completed in 1921, it originally housed the university's home economics department. The building was privately funded by local citizens, including the $16,000 construction cost as well as several thousand dollars worth of equipment. One of the largest donors was Joshua Raynolds, whose mother was the building's namesake.

The building was designed by Edward B. Christy, who was also responsible for the Pueblo style remodeling of Hodgin Hall in 1908. As with nearly all subsequent buildings on campus, Sara Raynolds Hall also employed the Pueblo style. It is a one-story, brick bearing wall structure with a beige stucco exterior. The building was added to the New Mexico State Register of Cultural Properties and the National Register of Historic Places in 1988.

References

External links

Buildings and structures in Albuquerque, New Mexico
Buildings and structures completed in 1921
University and college buildings on the National Register of Historic Places in New Mexico
New Mexico State Register of Cultural Properties
Pueblo Revival architecture in Albuquerque, New Mexico
University of New Mexico
National Register of Historic Places in Albuquerque, New Mexico